Minesweeper is a logic puzzle video game genre generally played on personal computers. The game features a grid of clickable squares, with hidden "mines" scattered throughout the board. The objective is to clear the board without detonating any mines, with help from clues about the number of neighboring mines in each field. Variants of Minesweeper have been made that expand on the basic concepts, such as Minesweeper X, Crossmines, and Minehunt. Minesweeper has been incorporated as a minigame in other games, such as RuneScape and Minecraft 2015 April Fools update.

The origin of Minesweeper is unclear. According to TechRadar, the first version of the game was 1990's Microsoft Minesweeper, but Eurogamer says Mined-Out by Ian Andrew (1983) was the first Minesweeper game. Curt Johnson, the creator of Microsoft Minesweeper, acknowledges that his game's design was borrowed from another game, but it was not Mined-Out, and he does not remember which game it is.

Gameplay
Minesweeper is a puzzle video game. In the game, mines (that resemble naval mines in the classic theme) are scattered throughout a board, which is divided into cells. Cells have three states: unopened, opened and flagged. An unopened cell is blank and clickable, while an opened cell is exposed. Flagged cells are unopened cells marked by the player to indicate a potential mine location; some implementations make flagged cells unopenable to reduce the risk of uncovering a suspected mine.

A player selects a cell to open it. If a player opens a mined cell, the game ends in a loss. Otherwise, the opened cell displays either a number, indicating the number of mines diagonally and/or adjacent to it, or a blank tile (or "0"), and all adjacent non-mined cells will automatically be opened. Players can also flag a cell, visualised by a flag being put on the location, to denote that they believe a mine to be in that place. Flagged cells are still considered unopened, and may be unflagged. In some versions of the game when the number of adjacent mines is equal to the number of adjacent flagged cells, all adjacent non-flagged unopened cells will be opened, a process known as chording.

Objective and strategy
A game of Minesweeper begins when the player first selects a cell on a board. In some versions of the game the first click is guaranteed to be safe; whilst some other variants further guaranteeing that all adjacent cells are safe as well. During the game, the player uses information given from the opened cells to deduce further cells that are safe to open, iteratively gaining more information to solve the board. The player is also given the number of remaining mines in the board, known as the minecount, which is calculated as the total number of mines subtracted by the number of flagged cells (thus the minecount can be negative if too many flags have been placed).

To win a game of Minesweeper, all non-mine cells must be opened without opening a mine. There is no score, however there is a timer recording the time taken to finish the game. Difficulty can be increased by adding mines or starting with a larger grid. Microsoft Minesweeper offers three default board configurations, usually known as beginner, intermediate and expert, in order of increasing difficulty. Beginner is usually on an 8x8 or 9x9 board containing 10 mines, Intermediate is usually on a 16x16 board with 40 mines and expert is usually on a 30x16 board with 99 mines, however this is usually customisable.

History
According to TechRadar, Minesweeper was created by Microsoft in the 1990s, but Eurogamer commented that Minesweeper gained a lot of inspiration from a "lesser known, tightly designed game", Mined-Out by Ian Andrew for the ZX Spectrum in 1983. According to Andrew, Microsoft copied Mined-Out for Microsoft Minesweeper. The Microsoft version made its first appearance in 1990, in Windows Entertainment Pack, which was given as part of Windows 3.11. The game was written by Robert Donner and Curt Johnson. Johnson stated that Microsoft Minesweeper's design was borrowed from another game, but it was not Mined-Out, and he does not remember which game it was.   In 2001, a group called the International Campaign to Ban Winmine campaigned for the game's topic to be changed from landmines. The group commented that the game "is an offence against the victims of the mines". A later version, found present in Windows Vista's Minesweeper offered a tileset with flowers replacing mines as a response.

The game is frequently bundled with operating systems and desktop environments, including Minesweeper for IBM's OS/2, Microsoft Windows, KDE, GNOME and Palm OS. Microsoft Minesweeper was included by default in Windows until Windows 8 (2012). Microsoft replaced this with a free-to-play version of the game, downloadable from the Microsoft Store, which is "riddled with ads", according to How-To Geek.

Variants
Variants of Minesweeper have been made that expand on the basic concepts and add new game design elements. Minesweeper X is a clone of the Microsoft version with improved randomization and more statistics, and is popular with players of the game intending to reach a fast time. Arbiter and Viennasweeper are also clones, and are used similarly to Minesweeper X. Crossmines is a more complex version of the game's base idea, adding linked mines and irregular blocks. BeTrapped transposes the game into a mystery game setting. There are several direct clones of Microsoft Minesweeper available online. 

Minesweeper was made part of RuneScape through a minigame called Vinesweeper. The non-Japanese releases of Pokémon HeartGold and SoulSilver contained a variation of both Minesweeper and Picross. The video game Minecraft released a version of Minesweeper in its 2015 April Fool's update. The HP-48G graphing calculator includes a variant called "Minehunt", where the player has to move safely from one corner of the playfield to the other. The only clues given are how many mines are in the squares surrounding the player's current position. Google search includes a version of Minesweeper as an easter egg, available by searching the game's name. 

A logic puzzle variant of minesweeper, suitable for playing on paper, starts with some squares already revealed. The player cannot reveal any more squares, but must instead mark the remaining mines correctly. Unlike the usual form of minesweeper, these puzzles usually have a unique solution. These puzzles appeared under the name "tentaizu" (天体図), Japanese for a star map, in Southwest Airlines' magazine Spirit in 2008–2009.

Competitive play 
Competitive Minesweeper players aim to complete the game as fast as possible. The players memorize patterns to reduce times. Some players use a technique called the "1.5 click", which aids in revealing mines, while other players do not flag mines at all.  The game is played competitively in tournaments. A community of dedicated players has emerged; this community was centralized on websites such as Minesweeper.info. As of 2015, according to the Guinness Book of World Records, the fastest time to complete all three difficulties of Minesweeper is 38.65 seconds by Kamil Murański in 2014.

Computational complexity
In 2000, Richard Kaye published a proof that it is NP-complete to determine whether a given grid of uncovered, correctly flagged, and unknown squares, the labels of the foremost also given, has an arrangement of mines for which it is possible within the rules of the game. The argument is constructive, a method to quickly convert any Boolean circuit into such a grid that is possible if and only if the circuit is satisfiable; membership in NP is established by using the arrangement of mines as a certificate. If, however, a minesweeper board is already guaranteed to be consistent, solving it is not known to be NP-complete, but it has been proven to be co-NP-complete.  In the latter case, however, minesweeper exhibits a phase transition analogous to -SAT: when more than 25% squares are mined, solving a board requires guessing an exponentially-unlikely set of mines. Kaye also proved that infinite Minesweeper is Turing-complete.

See also
Board puzzles with algebra of binary variables

References

Inline citations

General references

  — An open-access paper explaining Kaye's NP-completeness result.

External links
 Richard Kaye's Minesweeper pages
 Microsoft Minesweeper playable in the browser on the Internet Archive

 
Puzzle video games
Windows games
Linux games
NP-complete problems
Casual games
Video games about bomb disposal